The Kroger On Track for the Cure 250 presented by the Southern Dodge Dealers was a NASCAR Nationwide Series stock car race that took place at Memphis International Raceway in Memphis, Tennessee, from 1999 to 2009. The 2007 race had twenty-five caution periods, ten more than any other Nationwide Series race that has been held at MMP. The race ended under a green-white-checker finish every year from 2004, when the rule was first implemented in the series, to 2009, the final race at the track.

In 2001, the race was scheduled to be shown on tape delay on TNT. The Busch Series race was postponed due to rain to Sunday, the same day as the Winston Cup event in Martinsville. However, the same storm delayed the Martinsville race, so the Busch Series race was aired live on NBC.

On October 24, 2009, Brad Keselowski won the race at MMP by holding off Kyle Busch to the finish line on the 11th and final annual racing event at MMP, as Dover Motorsports, Inc. announced the closure of Memphis Motorsports Park, a week after that race.

Past winners

2001–2002: Race postponed from Saturday to Sunday due to rain.
2004–2009: Race extended due to a green–white–checker finish.

References

External links

Former NASCAR races
NASCAR Xfinity Series races
 
Recurring sporting events established in 1999
1999 establishments in Tennessee
Recurring sporting events disestablished in 2009
2009 disestablishments in Tennessee